Sioe Haioti, born March 31, 1985 is a Niuean weightlifter.

Haioti competed in the 2006 Commonwealth Games. She placed fifth in the Women's 75 kg+ Combined by lifting 214 kg.

Haioti also took part in the 2005 Weightlifting World Championships.

References

1985 births
Niuean female weightlifters
Weightlifters at the 2006 Commonwealth Games
Living people